Quzleja (also Romanized as Qūzlejā and  Qowzlejā; also known as Kizludzha, Qizluja, and Yāqūzlejeh) is a village in Bonab Rural District, in the Central District of Zanjan County, Zanjan Province, Iran. At the 2006 census, its population was 54, in 10 families.

References 

Populated places in Zanjan County